Samuel Woodson may refer to:
 Samuel H. Woodson (Kentucky politician) (1777–1827), U.S. Representative from Kentucky
 Samuel H. Woodson (Missouri politician) (1815–1881), U.S. Representative from Missouri and son of the above
 S. Howard Woodson (1916–1999), American pastor, civil rights leader and politician from New Jersey